Banque de Luxembourg is a financial institution in Luxembourg, which primarily focuses on wealth management and high-net-worth individuals. It is owned by French banking group Crédit Mutuel, through the latter's subsidiary Crédit Industriel et Commercial.

History 
Founded in 1920, the history of Banque de Luxembourg is closely tied in with the rise of the financial centre of Luxembourg.
 1920 : Banque d'Alsace et de Lorraine, later Crédit Industriel d'Alsace et de Lorraine (CIAL), opens its first branch in Luxembourg.
 1937 : Banque Mathieu Frères, the forerunner of Banque de Luxembourg, is founded.
 1969 : CIAL becomes a major shareholder in Banque Mathieu Frères.
 1977 : Deutsche Bank Luxembourg S.A. becomes a shareholder in Banque Mathieu Frères, which changes its name to Banque de Luxembourg.
 1991 : Banque de Luxembourg takes over the Luxembourg activities of CIAL.
 1994 : The bank opens its new head office at 14 Boulevard Royal, Luxembourg.
 1999 : Banque de Luxembourg launches Fund-Market S.A., the independent fund adviser. Fund-Market's products and services were integrated into the Bank's offer in 2010.
 2002 : Following restructuring, Deutsche Bank sells its 28.95% holding in Banque de Luxembourg to CIC Group, which becomes a shareholder via the Banque Fédérative du Crédit Mutuel (CIC Group holding company).
 2005 : Banque de Luxembourg Fund Research & Asset Management (BL FR&AM) brings together the bank's investment analytical and management expertise.
 2010 : Banque de Luxembourg opens a branch in Belgium to meet the needs of clients from the Belgian province of Luxembourg.

Shareholder structure 
Banque de Luxembourg is a wholly owned subsidiary of Crédit Mutuel via the Crédit Industriel et Commercial (CIC). CIC serves around 4.97 million private, professional and corporate clients. CIC is 93%-owned by Banque Fédérative du Crédit Mutuel (BFCM), the holding company of the bancassurance group Crédit Mutuel Centre Est Europe-CIC. A non-listed company, the Crédit Mutuel Centre Est Europe-CIC group combines the strengths of 11 regional federations of Crédit Mutuel with those of CIC. Owned by around 4.97 million sociétaires (shareholding members), and with 69,500 employees serving 23.8 million customers, it is a major player in the French retail banking sector. The Crédit Mutuel Centre Est Europe-CIC group's excellent financial strength is reflected in equity capital of EUR 39.6 billion and its tier one solvency ratio of 15%. The rating agencies Moody's and Standard & Poor's assign a rating of Aa3 and A+ respectively to the BFCM group, making it one of the highest-rated banks in the eurozone.

Branches

Luxembourg 
Designed by Bernardo Fort-Brescia, from the architectural practice Arquitectonica in Miami, the Bank's head office and recently inaugurated extension houses the Bank's Luxembourg-based sales teams. The support and back office teams are located at the administrative headquarters in Howald.

Belgium 
The Bank's two private banking centres in Brussels and in Ghent provide fully fledged private banking services to wealthy residents in Belgium.

See also
 List of banks in Luxembourg

References

External links

Banque de Luxembourg News

Banks of Luxembourg
Banks established in 1920
Economy of Luxembourg
Crédit Mutuel